Gordon "Cocker" Strang (10 February 1908 – 8 October 1951) was an Australian rules footballer who played in the Victorian Football League for the Richmond Football Club between 1931 and 1936.

Strang first came under notice when he kicked 10 goals for Jindera FC in the Albury & Border Football Association, in 1927.

He was the son of Bill Strang, who played for South Melbourne between 1904 and 1913 (and was South Melbourne's leading goal-kicker in 1913)

After a year in Tasmania as captain-coach of North Launceston, he returned to Richmond, and played all of Richmond's 18 matches in the 1938 season, scoring 6 goals.

He then transferred to Wodonga as captain-coach in 1939.

He was the brother of Richmond premiership player Doug Strang and uncle of dual Richmond premiership player Geoff Strang and 1967 Tiger's premiership player John Perry. His (and Doug's) other brothers, Colin Strang and Allan Strang also played VFL football: for St Kilda (2 games, 1933), and South Melbourne (15 games, 1947–1948), respectively.

Richmond
Along with his brother Doug (who was selected at full-forward), he made his debut for Richmond in the first round of the 1931 season, on 2 May 1931, at centre half-back; The Argus commented that, on debut, he had "showed grit" and had "kicked well".

North Launceston
In 1937 he coached North Launceston to runner-up position in the Northern Tasmanian Football Association; and, despite rumours to the contrary, he did not apply for the position of coach in the 1938 season.

Richmond
He returned to play for Richmond in 1938; and he played in each of Richmond's 18 games that season.

Wodonga
In May 1939, Strong took over the Railway Hotel in Wodonga and Richmond cleared Strang to Wodonga.

Strang polled the most votes in the 1939 Ovens and Murray Football League Best & Fairest Award, the Morris Medal, but was suspended by the O&MFL Tribunal during the season. He went onto win the Morris Medal in 1940. He also won Wodonga's best and fairest in 1939 and 1940.

In 1939 he coached Wodonga in a losing Grand Final over an Albury team that was coached by his brother, Doug.

The Ovens and Murray Football League premiers in 1939 was the Albury Football Club.

Footnotes

References 
 Hogan P: The Tigers of Old, Richmond FC, Melbourne 1996

External links
 
 
 1930 - East Albury FC team photo

1908 births
1951 deaths
Australian Rules footballers: place kick exponents
Richmond Football Club players
Richmond Football Club Premiership players
Albury Football Club players
Wodonga Football Club players
Wodonga Football Club coaches
North Launceston Football Club coaches
Two-time VFL/AFL Premiership players
Australian rules footballers from Albury